Chokmagu  is a market center of Phidim Municipality in Panchthar District in the Province No. 1 in eastern Nepal. It was annexed to Phidim on 18 May 2014 to form the municipality. At the time of the 1991 Nepal census it had a population of 5698 people living in 835 individual households.

References

Populated places in Panchthar District